Zel M. Fischer (born April 28, 1963) is an Associate Judge of the Supreme Court of Missouri. Judge Fischer served a two-year term as chief justice from 2017 until 2019. A native of Watson, he received his undergraduate degree from William Jewell College and his law degree from the University of Missouri-Kansas City.  While at William Jewell College he was a member of the Alpha Delta Chapter of Kappa Alpha Order. He was elected as a Republican to serve as Atchison County Judge in 2006 after private practice in Atchison, Nodaway and Holt counties for nearly 15 years.

Following the Missouri Plan for the appointment of appellate judges in Missouri, Fischer was one of three candidates proposed to Governor Matt Blunt by the state's Appellate Judicial Committee to replace Judge Stephen N. Limbaugh Jr.  Blunt announced his appointment of Fischer on October 15, 2008 on the grounds of the Atchison County, Missouri Courthouse in Rock Port, Missouri.  He cited Fischer's judicial philosophy of strict interpretation of the state's constitution and laws as the reason for his selection.  He was sworn in as a Supreme Court judge on October 23, 2008.

References

External links
 Ray Scherer (October 16, 2008). "Newest Justice Calls Atchison County Home".  "St. Joseph News-Press"
 October 25, 2008. "Zel Fischer Informally Sworn in as Judge". "St. Joseph News-Press"
 Judge Zel Fischer on the Missouri Supreme Court website

|-

1963 births
21st-century American judges
Living people
People from Atchison County, Missouri
Judges of the Supreme Court of Missouri
University of Missouri–Kansas City alumni
William Jewell College alumni
Chief Justices of the Supreme Court of Missouri